Terme Taurine, also known as the Taurine Baths, is a former Roman bathhouse complex located outside of the Italian city of Civitavecchia. The site contains ruins dating to both Republican and Imperial era Rome, with the oldest structures at Terme Taurine having been built in the first century BC. In modern era, the baths are considered an archaeological park.

History

Terme Taurine was first established on a hill overlooking Civitavecchia during the Roman Republican era in 86 BC. The bathhouse was known as the Taurine Baths in reference to the nearby Ancient Roman village of Aquae Tauri. Local legend holds that the hot spring that the baths were fed by was created when a bull stamped his hoof on ground, causing hot water to spring forth. The republic era baths at Terme Taurine featured beauty parlors, changing rooms, and hot and cold pools. Several of these pools and the mosaics adorning them can still be visited. The baths also once held a shrine to water nymphs, who were believed by the Romans to be the guardian spirits of underground springs.

The complex at Terme Taurine was greatly expanded by Roman emperor Hadrian (117 - 138 AD) from 123 to 136 AD. The Imperial era baths  were open to all social classes, with some people being granted free admission. A library and shops were also part of the building. The baths became a popular stop-over site for visitors to the nearby port.

Terme Taurine remained in use until the mid 6th century, when a war between the Goths and Byzantine Empire resulted in them being looted. Much of the marble walling of the baths was stripped off, and the baths fell into disuse. In 1770 the Papal States began to excavate parts of the site and built an Italian-style garden nearby, which can still be seen.

The baths reopened in 2020 after a brief period of restoration. Local notables have proposed Terme Taurine be nominated as a UNESCO world heritage site.

Notable visitors 
During the reign of the Emperor Commodus, Aelius Lampridius recorded that the emperor, upon finding his bathwater lukewarm, had an attendant thrown into an oven while visiting Terme Taurine. Roman Poet Rutilius Claudius Namatianus visited the baths in the 5th century and described them in his travelogue.

References

Archaeological sites in Italy
Roman archaeology
Roman sites in Italy